The name Victor has been used for five tropical cyclones worldwide.

In the Atlantic:
 Tropical Storm Victor (2021), large tropical storm that formed at an unusually low latitude of 8.3°N, and stayed at sea.

In the Western Pacific: 
 Tropical Storm Victor (1997) (T9712, 13W, Goring), caused severe damage in China. 

In the Australian region: 
 Cyclone Victor (1986), considered the most severe cyclone of the season. 
 Cyclone Victor (1998), crossed into the Indian Ocean and was renamed Cindy. 

In the South Pacific: 
 Cyclone Victor (2016), did not affect land.

Atlantic hurricane set index articles
Pacific typhoon set index articles
Australian region cyclone set index articles
South Pacific cyclone set index articles